In ancient Greek and Anatolian mythology, Mount Agdistis also called Agdos was a sacred mountain located at Pessinus in Phrygia.

The mountain was personified as a daemon called Agdistis. Agdistis was a deity connected with the Phrygian worship of the Great Mother Cybele and her consort Attis. According to Pausanias, Attis was buried beneath Mount Agdistis.

References
Theoi Project: Agdistis

Locations in Greek mythology
Phrygia
Sacred mountains